Grounded – Chapter Eight is the eighth and final studio album by the German power metal band Metalium.

Track listing
"Heavy Metal" (Lars Ratz, Tolo Grimalt) - 3:33
"Light of Day" (Michael Ehré) - 4:08
"Pay for Fee" (Ratz, Grimalt) - 4:22
"Pharaoh's Slavery" (Ratz, Grimalt) - 6:15
"Crossroad Overload" (Ehré) - 4:57
"Falling into Darkness" (Ratz, Grimalt) - 4:50
"Alone" (Ratz, Grimalt) - 4:01
"Borrowed Time" (Ehré) - 6:09
"Once Loyal" (Ehré) - 3:46
"Lonely" (Ehré) - 5:48
"Can't Tell The Future" (Japanese bonus track)

Personnel
Band members
Henning Basse - lead and backing vocals  
Matthias Lange - guitars
Tolo Grimalt - guitars ♠
Lars Ratz - bass, keyboards, additional guitars, producer
Michael Ehré - drums, keyboards, additional guitars

♠ Grimalt does not actually play on the album

External links
Metalium Official Website

Metalium albums
2009 albums
Massacre Records albums